Berzelia is an unincorporated community in Columbia County in the U.S. state of Georgia.

History
A post office called Berzelia was established in 1835 and remained in operation until 1933. In 1900, the community had 84 inhabitants.

References

Unincorporated communities in Columbia County, Georgia
Unincorporated communities in Georgia (U.S. state)